Joe Swail (born 29 August 1969) is a Northern Irish former professional snooker player from Belfast. He retired in May 2019 after being relegated from the tour. He has reached ten major ranking semi-finals, including the 2000 and 2001 World Championships but only one final. Swail is renowned for playing well at the Crucible Theatre, having reached the last 16 on four further occasions. He is also a former English amateur champion and Northern Ireland amateur runner-up, and has captained Northern Ireland internationally. He was Irish champion in 1992 and 2005.

Career
Swail has had a very mixed history in the rankings. He took just two seasons to reach the Top 32, and three to reach the top sixteen, but only remained there for one season, before sliding out of the Top 32 after winning just two matches in 1997–98. His 2000 Crucible achievement made him the second player (after Rex Williams) to return to the Top 16 in the rankings after dropping out of the Top 32 in between. He climbed to No. 10 after his 2001 semi-final, but dropped to 16–27–30–40 in the next few years, finishing with a nightmare season in 2004–05. He then bounced back with an impressive and consistent showing in 2005–06 that brought him back into the Top 32. He came close to the Top 16 in 2006/2007, finishing one place short at 17 despite beating Mark Williams in round 1 of the 2007 World Championships from 0–4 down He came from 7–9 behind to beat Judd Trump 10–9 in qualifying for the 2008 World Championship. Swail scored a comprehensive 10–4 victory over Stephen Lee in the first round at the Crucible, before a 12–13 defeat by Liang Wenbo in the second round, after a trademark comeback from 8–12 down, due to a bad miss on the brown in the decider. This caused him to again miss the top 16, finishing the season in 20th place.

He started 2008–09 poorly, with four successive first-round defeats. His first victory of the season was against Liang Wenbo in qualifying for the 2008 UK Snooker Championship. He then reached his first ever ranking final in his 18-year professional career at the 2009 Welsh Open. Swail led the match 5–2, but never won another frame, losing 9–5 to Ali Carter.

After finishing 69th the end of the 2011–12 season, outside of the top 64 that retain their professional status, Swail dropped of the tour after 21 years as a professional.

As an amateur, Swail played in many of the Players Tour Championship events. At the Paul Hunter Classic, Swail defeated players such as Jimmy White, Shaun Murphy and Barry Hawkins en route to the final, doubling the black ball in a final frame decider against Hawkins. In the final, he was defeated 1–4 by Mark Selby. This not only booked his place on the tour for the following season, but also qualified him for the PTC Finals in Galway, Ireland, where he defeated Stephen Maguire 4–3, despite being 0–3 down. He lost 0–4 in the Last 16 to fellow Northern Irishman Mark Allen. At the 2013 World Snooker Championship, Swail entered the pre-qualifying rounds for amateur players, he won 3 of these matches, as well as his Last 96 and Last 80 matches against Pankaj Advani, and Adam Duffy respectively. He lost his Last 64 match against Mark Joyce 7–10, picking up £4,600 for his efforts.

After regaining his professional status due to his performances in the previous season's PTC events, Swail was able to play in ranking events during the season. He lost in the Last 96 of the Wuxi Classic, 2–5 to Ken Doherty, in the qualifiers for the Australian Open, he beat Darren Cook 5–2, before losing 4–5 in the Last 96 to Pankaj Advani.

Playing style
Swail is known for his very unorthodox way of cueing up. Instead of keeping his cue-arm vertical as most players do, Swail cues up with his arm bent at least 45 degrees outwards, and his elbow towards his back. Although it appears to be extremely difficult to actually pot balls when cueing like that it has worked for Swail and provides him with an abundance of cue power.

Personal life
Swail is congenitally hearing-impaired, and his brother Liam is completely deaf. He has told the BBC that he regards this as an advantage for snooker, as he is less likely to be distracted by crowd and other background noise.
Swail's nickname, "the Outlaw", is a pun on his name "Joe Swail" and The Outlaw Josey Wales, the 1976 film. He has a son, Joe Jr. and supports Liverpool F.C.

Performance and rankings timeline

Career finals

Ranking finals: 1

Minor-ranking finals: 2 (1 title)

Non-ranking finals: 8 (7 titles)

Pro-am finals: 12 (5 titles)

Amateur finals: 4 (2 titles)

Notes and references

External links

Joe Swail at worldsnooker.com

Snooker players from Northern Ireland
Deaf sportspeople
1969 births
Living people
Sportspeople from Belfast
Deaf people from Northern Ireland